The Grand Prix of Texas was an American Le Mans Series sports car race held at the infield road course of the Texas Motor Speedway in Fort Worth, Texas.  The 2001 event marked the last time the ALMS raced on a roval.

Results

References

External links
Ultimate Racing History: Texas archive
Racing Sports Cars: Texas archive

 
Recurring sporting events disestablished in 2001
Recurring sporting events established in 2000
2000 establishments in Texas
2001 disestablishments in Texas